Earl Wallace Urquhart (February 22, 1921 – August 17, 1971) was a Canadian politician and lawyer.

Early life 
Urquhart was born in West Bay, Inverness County, Nova Scotia, Canada. Urquhart served in the Canadian Infantry Corps and the Royal Canadian Air Force during World War II.

Political career 
he was elected to the Nova Scotia House of Assembly for Richmond in a 1949 by-election held after Lauchlin Daniel Currie was named to the bench. He served as a member of the assembly from 1949 to 1963. From 1960 to 1962, he was the House Leader. He was Leader of the Nova Scotia Liberal Party from 1962 to 1965.

He was summoned to the Senate on February 24, 1966 on the recommendation of Lester B. Pearson. A Liberal, he represented the senatorial division of Inverness-Richmond in the province of Nova Scotia until his death at the age of 50.

References 

1921 births
1971 deaths
Canadian senators from Nova Scotia
Liberal Party of Canada senators
Lawyers in Nova Scotia
Nova Scotia Liberal Party MLAs
Nova Scotia political party leaders
People from Cumberland County, Nova Scotia
Canadian people of Scottish descent
20th-century Canadian lawyers